Nuestra Belleza Latina 2009 is the third season of Nuestra Belleza Latina premiered on March 2009. Auditions were once again held in five major US cities (Los Angeles, California; Dallas, Texas; Miami, Florida; Chicago, Illinois; and New York City, New York) and in San Juan, Puerto Rico. During the audition process, 75 young women were given passes to the semi-finals in Miami, Florida. With the twist of adding one more contestant named "La Intrusa" (Francheska Mattei). For several weeks, Francheska Mattei, a professional actress, posed as one of the contestants to know the rumors, secrets, and even gossip from the girls. The elimination process was quick, with 15 women leaving the first day, 40 on the second week, and finally 8 women were eliminated leaving the 12 finalists who will be moving into a Miami mansion where they will be living together for the rest of the competition. Each week, viewers will have a chance to vote for their favorite finalists. The three women with the fewest votes will then be in danger of being eliminated. However, two of the women in the bottom three will have the chance of being saved, one by her fellow finalists, and the other by the judges. This year they had an "Intrusa", the one that spilled the gossip about the contestants and it was Puerto Rican, Francheska Mattei.

Greidys Gil contestant representing Cuba won the competition.

Changes 
There were some mayor changes to this Season, Julian Gil left the show, and was replaced with Model/Actor Jorge Aravena. Osmel Sousa and Lupita Jones became the main Judges. Melissa Marty became a correspondent in the show, she went backstage and had a one-on-one with the girls during the Show and at the "Belleza House". The show moved from Tuesdays to Sundays at 8pm/7c. For the first time in Nuestra Belleza Latina history a girl was expelled. Contestant, Stephanie broke the main rule of Nuestra Belleza Latina of having contact with an outside member. The contestant was  soon replaced by Chastelyn.

Judges 
Osmel Sousa
Lupita Jones
Jorge Aravena

Elimination chart 

{| class="wikitable" style="text-align:center; font-size:85%"
| colspan="2" align="right" | Stage:
| colspan="8" bgcolor="palegoldenrod" align="Center" | Finals
|-
| colspan="2" align="right" | Week:
| align="center" width=6% | 4/5
| align="center" width=6% | 4/13 
| align="center" width=6% | 4/19
| align="center" width=6% | 4/26
| align="center" width=6% | 5/3
| align="center" width=6% | 5/10
| align="center" width=6% | 5/17
|-
! width="2%" | Place
! colspan="1" align="center" | Contestant
! colspan="6" align="center" | Result
| colspan="1" bgcolor="red" align="Center" | Finale
|-
| bgcolor="deeppink" align="center" | 1
| width="8%" | Greydis Gil
| Safe
| Safe
| Safe
| Safe
| Safe
| bgcolor="#8AB8E6" | Bottom 2
| bgcolor="deeppink" align="center" | Winner
|-
| bgcolor="cyan" align="center" | 2
| Marycarmen López
| Safe
| Safe
| Safe
| Safe
| Safe
| Safe
| bgcolor="cyan" align="center" | Runner-Up
|-
| bgcolor="palegoldenrod" align="center" | 3
| Catalina López
| Safe
| Safe
| Safe
| Safe
| bgcolor="#8AB8E6" | Bottom 2
| Safe
| bgcolor="#EEE8AA" align="center" | 3rd Place
|-
| bgcolor="palegoldenrod" align="center" | 4
| Mónica De León
| bgcolor="#E0F0FF" | Bottom 3
| Safe
| Safe
| bgcolor="#E0F0FF" | Bottom 3
| Safe
| Safe
| bgcolor="#EEE8AA" align="center" | 4th Place
|-
| bgcolor="palegoldenrod" align="center" | 5
| Janice Bencosme
| Safe
| Safe
| Safe
| Safe
| Safe
| Safe
| bgcolor="#EEE8AA" align="center" | 5th Place|-
| bgcolor="palegoldenrod" align="center" | 6
| Berenice Guzmán
| bgcolor="#8AB8E6" | Bottom 2
| Safe
| Safe
| bgcolor="#8AB8E6" | Bottom 2
| Safe
| bgcolor="#E0F0FF" | Bottom 3
| bgcolor="#EEE8AA" align="center" | 6th Place
|-
| align="center" bgcolor="palegoldenrod" | 7
| Monica Pastrana
| Safe
| bgcolor="#E0F0FF" | Bottom 3
| Safe
| Safe
| bgcolor="#E0F0FF" | Bottom 3
| bgcolor="#EEE8AA" align="center" | 7th Place
| style="background:#919191" |
|-
| align="center" bgcolor="palegoldenrod" | 8
| Jennifer Andrade
| Safe
| Safe
| bgcolor="#8AB8E6" | Bottom 2
| Safe
| bgcolor="#EEE8AA" align="center" | 8th Place
| style="background:#919191" colspan="2" |
|-
| align="center" bgcolor="palegoldenrod" | 9
| Chastelyn Rodriguez
| Safe
| Safe
| bgcolor="#E0F0FF" | Bottom 3
| bgcolor="#EEE8AA" align="center" | 9th Place
| style="background:#919191" colspan="3" |
|-
| align="center" bgcolor="palegoldenrod" | 10
| Susie De Los Santos
| Safe
| bgcolor="#8AB8E6" | Bottom 2
| bgcolor="#EEE8AA" align="center" | 10th Place
| style="background:#919191" colspan="4" |
|-
| align="center" bgcolor="palegoldenrod" | 11
| Anna Valencia
| Safe
| bgcolor="#EEE8AA" align="center" | 11th Place
| style="background:#919191" colspan="5" |
|-
| align="center" bgcolor="palegoldenrod" | 12
| Vanessa Lotero
| bgcolor="#EEE8AA" align="center" | 12th Place
| style="background:#919191" colspan="6" |
|-
| align="center" bgcolor="CCCCCC" rowspan="8" | 13-14
| Stephanie Figueroa
| bgcolor="CCCCCC" rowspan="2" align="center" | Elim
| style="background:#919191" colspan="7" rowspan="2" |
|-
| Francheska Mattei
|}

 Contestants 

 Contestants 

 Disqualifications 
 Stephanie Figueroa  - Disqualified during the first week of the series for seeing her boyfriend, which was against the competition rules of complete isolation from the outside world. Chastelyn Rodriguez replaced Stephanie.

 Countries Being Represented 

Winner
Runner-Up
Eliminated
First Place
 CPW: Countries Previously won
 : Countries Previously won

 Season 3, Episode 1: Castings 2009 
Original Air Date—1 March 2009
The best of the auditions held in Los Angeles, Dallas, Puerto Rico, Chicago, New York and Miami.

The Guest Judges were:

The following contestants were chosen:

 Season 3, Episode 2: The Envelopes 
Original Air Date—8 March 2009
The 75 selected contestants arrive to Miami. 20 of them receive an envelope the very first day. 10 of them are eliminated.

 Season 3, Episode 3: The Coaches Eliminate 
Original Air Date—15 March 2009
The Choreography, Diction and Runway coaches cut 15 more girls from the group. The remaining 50 girls have to show their best talent onstage. After the performance, the show judges eliminate another 10 contestants.

 Season 3, Episode 4: Group Task 
Original Air Date—22 March 2009
The 41 remaining girls are divided in groups to perform onstage. Four groups have musical numbers and the other four acting scenes. At the end of the show, the judges eliminate 20 girls.

 Season 3, Episode 5: Revealing the Mole 
Original Air Date—29 March 2009
The mole is revealed and the 20 remaining girls face the judges one more time to receive their final evaluation. 12 of them are named finalists and go to the next stage of the show. The rest of the girls are eliminated.

The Final 12 are Chosen:

 Season 3, Episode 6: No Make-up Photoshoot 
Original Air Date—5 April 2009
The 12 finalists move to the mansion, where they start training while they are tested every day. The first challenge of the season is a no-make up photo-shoot. The winner will appear in People en Español magazine (as part of the 50 most beautiful edition).

 Season 3, Episode 7: Hurricane Report 
Original Air Date—12 April 2009
The 11 remaining girls have to endure the hardest challenge of the season, reporting on location while a Hurricane hits the city with winds up to 100 miles per hour.

 Season 3, Episode 8: The Rope Course 
Original Air Date—19 April 2009
The 10 remaining girls have to compete in a challenging rope course, where they have to be the fastest and the smartest in order to win.

 Season 3, Episode 9: Tarantula Photo Shoot 
Original Air Date—26 April 2009
The 9 remaining girls face another breathtaking challenge. They have to pose for a print ad with a live tarantula walking over their shoulders, hands and face.

 Season 3, Episode 10: Novela Scenes 
Original Air Date—3 May 2009
The 8 remaining girls are paired to do a sequenced telenovela scene, live onstage. The three girls in danger of elimination answer questions while connected at a lie detector machine.

 Season 3, Episode 11: The Final Question 
Original Air Date—10 May 2009
The 7 remaining girls face the judges to hear them read the crudest critiques the audience posted online. They are challenge to respond to those critics -live- as if they were part of an interview.

 Season 3, Episode 12: The Finale 2009 
Original Air Date—17 May 2009
The 6 finalists chosen by the popular vote hit the runway for the last time. Greidys Gil was crowned "Nuestra Belleza Latina 2009"

Winner: Greydis Gil

 Orden de llamados 

 Contestants Notes 
 Catalina Lopez competed in Miss Ecuador 2006 where she won. She later represented Ecuador at Miss Universe 2006 in Los Angeles. She didn't classified as semifinalist. Then she represented Ecuador at the Miss Continente Americano 2006, where she finished in the Top 6.
 Monica Pastrana competed in Miss Puerto Rico 2009 where she landed a spot in the Top 20. She represented Puerto Rico at Miss International 2009 in China and she was unplaced.
| Jennifer Andrade is Miss Universe Honduras 2012 and will represent Honduras at Miss Universe 2012

 References 
 Nuestra Belleza Latina at Univision.com 
 
 Greidys Gil Wins Nuestra Belleza Latina 2009 
 Marycarmen becomes runner-up 
 En Busca de Nuestra Belleza Latina 2010 
 Episodios de nuestra belleza_latina''

External links 
 Nuestra Belleza Latina – Official Page

Winners 

Univision original programming
Nuestra Belleza Latina